Modern Inventions is a 1937 American comic science fiction animated short film produced by Walt Disney Productions and released by United Artists. The cartoon follows Donald Duck as he tours the fictional Museum of Modern Marvels. It was directed by Jack King, his Directional debut at Disney, and features original music by Oliver Wallace. The voice cast includes Clarence Nash as Donald, Billy Bletcher as the Robot Butler, Adriana Caselotti as the Robot Baby Carriage and Cliff Edwards (in one of his first Disney roles) as the Robot Barber.

Modern Inventions pokes fun at modern conveniences. The scene of Donald in the barber's chair was submitted by Carl Barks as his first story contribution at Disney. It is also the final Disney short to be released by United Artists.

Plot
Donald visits the "Museum of Modern Marvels" which showcases various futuristic electronic appliances and inventions. He uses a quarter on a line to get in (this allows him to keep his money and get in as well). Once inside, he is confronted with the "Robot Butler", a robotic golden cyclops. In a recurring gag, after Donald's hat is taken away from him by the Robot Butler, (saying "Your hat, sir." every time this happens), Donald uses a magic trick to produce another hat (similar to the way he produces flutes in The Band Concert). He says, "So!" and continues on his way. He first encounters a robotic hitchhiker, which activates when he makes driving noises. However, when he laughs at it, it pokes him in the eyes. Next he goes to a bundle wrapper, with a warning sign which says "Hands off! Do not touch!" but Donald kicks the sign away and hops on. When he pulls a lever, the machine proceeds to grab him in two robotic arms, put transparent wrapping paper around him, and put him in ribbons, like a package. He manages to break out by vigorously shaking, and continues exploring.

All the time, Donald has been losing hat after hat to the Robot Butler, making Donald angrier and angrier. Eventually, the Butler chases him through the museum to an automated baby carriage, which Donald hides inside. Donald changes his current hat to a baby bonnet to wear as is rocked as the song "Rock-a-bye Baby" is played. Donald then begins acting like a baby, sucking his feet, playing with toys offered to him, getting tickled under the chin, and having his toes counted "This Little Piggy went to market." Donald then starts crying about not getting his milk. The machine gets out a bottle of milk, but it hits him in the face instead of going into his mouth, making Donald agitated. The machine begins torturing him with toys and more milk in the face. The machine again squirts more milk in the face, after which it powders his bottom and pins him in a diaper.

The Robot Butler is again attracted by Donald's laughing and yanks the baby bonnet off his head. Donald produces one last hat and goes to one exhibit he has not yet seen: a self-operating barber chair. Using his "cheat" coin, Donald pays to get the works. However, the machine ends up flipping him over; the result is that the machine cuts off his tail feathers, cleans his bill, coats his face with shoe polish, sifts through his bottom feathers, applies a wet hot towel to it, slaps his blackened face with a cloth, combs his bottom with a comb, makes a gap through it, smooths it out and finally, gives him a pigtail design. The Robot Butler appears yet again, and he then removes Donald's last hat, which causes Donald to eventually enter an explosive tantrum.

Voice cast

Uncredited
 Clarence Nash as Donald Duck
 Billy Bletcher as Robot Butler
 Adriana Caselotti as Robot Baby Carriage
 Cliff Edwards as Robot Barber Chair

Releases
May 29, 1937 – original release (theatrical)
c. 1992 – Mickey's Mouse Tracks, Episode 7 (TV)
c. 1992 – Donald's Quack Attack, Episode 30 (TV)
December 24, 1997 – Ink & Paint Club, Episode 26 "Classic Donald" (TV)

Home media
The short was released on May 18, 2004, on Walt Disney Treasures: The Chronological Donald, Volume One: 1934-1941.

It was also released on VHS is 1985 on Cartoon Classics: The Continuing Adventures of Chip 'n' Dale Featuring Donald Duck.

Legacy
The cartoon would later serve as inspiration for suicide booths, fictional contraptions appearing in the American adult animated sitcom Futurama.

See also
Mickey Mouse (film series)

References

External links

1937 animated films
1937 short films
1930s English-language films
Donald Duck short films
1930s color films
1930s Disney animated short films
1930s science fiction comedy films
American robot films
Animated films about robots
Films about technology
Films set in museums
Films directed by Jack King
Films produced by Walt Disney
Films scored by Oliver Wallace
Films with screenplays by Carl Barks
American animated short films
Films about ducks
1930s American films